Eight Deliberations, also translated as Eight Considerations, Eight Discussions, Eight Discussed Cases or Eight Precedents, was a set of principles used by traditional Chinese law in order to lessen legal punishment on the royals, nobles and members of upper classes.

Origins
The Eight Deliberations were established by the Cao Wei dynasty during the Three Kingdoms period and originated from similar regulations in the Rites of Zhou. These suggested that criminals qualified under the following eight conditions could be considered for a commutation of sentence: 
Relatives of the sovereign 
Old acquaintances of the sovereign 
Individuals of great virtue 
Individuals of great ability
Meritorious individuals 
High officials 
Individuals exceptionally zealous at their government duties 
Guests of the sovereign (i.e. the descendants of preceding imperial families)

Eight Deliberations as a Legal Privilege

The earliest records of the whole set of Eight Deliberations existing nowadays can be found in the Tang Code, with its Article 7 exactly entitled the same name. According to it, permission from the emperor was required before any kind of interrogation or judgement could be carried out towards the offenders of the legally favored categories. However, as pointed out in Article 8, the legal privilege was not applicable to cases involving violation of the Ten Abominations. 

Since the Eight Deliberations was introduced, all of the following Chinese dynasties maintained the installment of this system to their law.

Deliberation for Relatives of the Emperor

Deliberation for Relatives of the Emperor included the relatives of the emperor of the sixth degree of mourning and closer. In addition, the emperor's paternal grandmother's and his mother's relatives within the fifth or closer degree of mourning, the empress's relatives within the fourth or closer degree of mourning were also considered.

Deliberation for Old Retainers of the Emperor

Deliberation for Old Retainers of the Emperor included those who had been in the emperor's service for a long period of time thereby merited this favor.

Deliberation for the Morally Worthy

Deliberation for the Morally Worthy included worthy men or superior men whose speech and conduct were greatly virtuous and may be taken as a model for the country.

Deliberation for Ability

Deliberation for Ability included people of great talent, able to lead armies, manage the affairs of government, correct the course of the emperor, and serve as a model for human relationships.

Deliberation for Achievement

Deliberation for Achievement included those of great achievement and glory because of their capability of leading armies for a long distance or civilizing the multitudes.

Deliberation for High Position

Deliberation for High Position included all active duty officials of the third rank and above, titular officials of the second rank and above, and persons with noble titles of the first rank.

Deliberation for Diligence

Deliberation for Diligence included military and civil officials who have displayed great diligence in their work through thorough occupation of public affairs or experiencing dangerous difficulties.

Deliberation for Guests of the State

Deliberation for Guests of the State was to treat the descendants of previous dynasties as guests of the state who could enjoy a legal privilege.

Notes

References
 Chü, Tung-tsu. (1965). Law and Society in Traditional China, Paris: Mouton & Co. 
 Johnson, Wallace Stephen (1979). The T’ang Code, Volume I, General Principles, Princeton: Princeton University Press.
 Johnson, Wallace Stephen (1997). The T’ang Code, Volume II, Specific Articles, Princeton: Princeton University Press.

Legal history of China
Clemency
3rd century in law
Cao Wei